Paramoor is a hamlet near St Mewan in Cornwall, England. Paramoor is southwest of Sticker and Paramoor Wood is nearby.

References

Hamlets in Cornwall